Pecos è qui: prega e muori (internationally released as Pecos Cleans Up) is a 1967 Italian Spaghetti Western film directed by Maurizio Lucidi.

The film is the immediate sequel of Due once di piombo; differently from the first chapter, it is more leaned towards comedy. It had  significant commercial success in South-American markets.

Cast 
 Robert Woods: Pecos Martinez  
 Erno Crisa: El Supremo
 Luciana Gilli: Dona Ramona 
 Ignazio Spalla: Dago (as Pedro Sanchez)
 Piero Vida: Paco
 Umberto Raho: Pinto

References

External links

1967 films
Spaghetti Western films
1967 Western (genre) films
Films directed by Maurizio Lucidi
Films scored by Lallo Gori
1960s Italian-language films
1960s Italian films